The  took place in 1575 near Nagashino Castle on the plain of Shitaragahara in the Mikawa Province of Japan. Takeda Katsuyori attacked the castle when Okudaira Sadamasa rejoined the Tokugawa, and when his original plot with Oga Yashiro for taking Okazaki Castle, the capital of Mikawa, was discovered. The Oda arquebusiers decisively defeated the cavalry tactics of the Takeda, who lost two-thirds of their army. The battle is often cited as a turning point in Japanese warfare and the first "modern" Japanese battle.

Background
Takeda Katsuyori attacked the castle on 16 June, using Takeda gold miners to tunnel under the walls, rafts to ferry samurai across the rivers, and siege towers. On 22 June the siege became a blockade, complete with palisades and cables strewn across the river.

Sadamasa's wife, Kamehime, was the daughter of Tokugawa Ieyasu. She helped to defend the castle by sending a letter with Torii Suneemon which asked her father for reinforcements. Torii reached Okazaki, where Ieyasu and Nobunaga promised help. Later, both Tokugawa Ieyasu and Oda Nobunaga sent troops to assist Sadamasa to break the siege and defeat Katsuyori. 
Returning that message back to the castle, Torii was captured and hung on a cross before the castle walls. However, he was still able to shout out that relief was on the way before he was killed.

Okudaira Sadamasa led the castle garrison and held firm, repelling the Takeda siege until an allied Tokugawa-Oda relief force arrived.

Battle

According to the Shinchō kōki, in 28 June 1575, Nobunaga and Ieyasu brought a total of 38,000 men to relieve the siege on the castle by Katsuyori. Of Takeda's original 15,000 besiegers, only 12,000 faced the Oda–Tokugawa army in this battle. The remaining 3,000 continued the siege to prevent the garrison in the castle from sallying forth and joining the battle. Oda and Tokugawa positioned their men across the plain from the castle, behind the Rengogawa, a small stream whose steep banks would slow down the cavalry charges for which the Takeda clan was known.

Seeking to protect his arquebusiers, which he would later become famous for, Nobunaga built a number of wooden palisades in a zig-zag pattern, setting up his gunners to attack the Takeda cavalry in volleys. The stockades served to blunt the force of charging cavalry.

Of Oda-Tokugawa's forces, an estimated 10,000 Ashigaru arquebusiers with 3,000 of the best shots, they were placed in three ranks under the command of Sassa Narimasa, Maeda Toshiie, and Honda Tadakatsu. Ōkubo Tadayo was stationed outside the palisade, as was Sakuma Nobumori, who feigned a retreat. Shibata Katsuie and Hashiba Hideyoshi protected the left flank.

Takeda Katsuyori arranged his forces in five groups of 3,000, with Baba Nobuharu on his right, Takeda Nobukado in the center, Yamagata Masakage on the left, Katsuyori in reserve and the final group under Takeda Nobuzane continuing the siege.

The Takeda army emerged from the forest and found themselves  from the Oda–Tokugawa stockades. The short distance, the great power of the Takeda cavalry charge, and the heavy rain, which Katsuyori assumed would render the matchlock guns useless, encouraged Takeda to order the charge. His cavalry was feared by both the Oda and Tokugawa forces, who had suffered a defeat at Mikatagahara.

The horses slowed to cross the stream and were fired upon as they crested the stream bed within  of the enemy. This was considered the optimum distance to penetrate the armor of the cavalry. In typical military strategy, the success of a cavalry charge depends on the infantry breaking ranks so that the cavalry can mow them down. If the infantry does not break, however, cavalry charges will often fail, with even trained warhorses refusing to advance into the solid ranks of opponents.

During the pitched battle that followed, between the continuous fire of the arquebusiers' volleys and the rigid control of the horo-shū (elite messengers), the Oda forces stood their ground and were able to repel every charge. Ashigaru spearmen stabbed through or over the stockades at horses that made it past the initial volleys and samurai, with swords and shorter spears, engaged in single combat with Takeda warriors. Strong defenses on the ends of the lines prevented Takeda forces from flanking the stockades. By mid-day the Takeda broke and fled, and the Oda forces vigorously pursued the routed army.

A night attack on the eve of the battle by Sakai Tadatsugu and Kanamori Nagachika, killed Takeda Nobuzane, a younger brother of Shingen.

Aftermath
Nobunaga's skillful use of firearms to defeat Takeda's cavalry tactics is often cited as a turning point in Japanese warfare; many cite it as the first "modern" Japanese battle.

In fact, the cavalry charge had been introduced only a generation earlier by Katsuyori's father, Takeda Shingen. Furthermore, firearms had already been used in other battles. Compounding this, Takeda Katsuyori wrongly assumed that the gunpowder used by Nobunaga's forces had been ruined by recent rain. Nobunaga's innovation was the wooden stockades and rotating volleys of fire, which led to a decisive victory at Nagashino. However, there has been much debate as to the validity of the assertion that Nobunaga used rotating volleys due to soldiers usually fighting in small groups under their liege lords. This is in addition to the fact that most of the troops would have to have been taken from under the command of their landlords, an extremely rare practice for the time.

According to Shinchō kōki, Takeda suffered a loss of 10,000 men, two-thirds of his original besieging force. Several of the Twenty-Four Generals of Takeda Shingen were killed in this battle, including Baba Nobuharu, Hara Masatane, Sanada Nobutsuna with his younger brother Sanada Masateru, Yamagata Masakage, Saegusa Moritomo, Tsuchiya Masatsugu, and Naitō Masatoyo. Obata Masamori received a mortal wound.

See also
 Karasawa Genba

References

Further reading
 Lamers, Jereon P (2000). Japonius Tyrannus. Leiden: Hotei Publishing.
De Lange, William. Samurai Battles: The Long Road to Unification. Toyp Press (2020) 
 Turnbull, Stephen (1998). The Samurai Sourcebook. London: Cassell & Co.
 Turnbull, Stephen (2000). Nagashino 1575: Slaughter at the Barricades. Oxford: Osprey Publishing.

1575 in Japan
Nagashino 1575
Nagashino 1575
Conflicts in 1575